Arsenal Pulp Press is a Canadian independent book publishing company, based in Vancouver, British Columbia. The company publishes a broad range of titles in both fiction and non-fiction, focusing primarily on underrepresented genres such as underground literature, LGBT literature, multiracial literature, graphic novels, visual arts, progressive and activist non-fiction and works in translation, and is noted for founding the annual Three-Day Novel Contest.

History

Established in 1971, Scriveners' Pulp Press Limited was one of several ventures in alternative arts and literature of the early 1970s. In addition to fiction, poetry and drama titles the Press issued a twice-monthly literary magazine, Three-Cent Pulp, from 1972 to 1978, which introduced a loyal readership to new writing and graphics from around the world. In 1977 Pulp held its first 3-Day Novel Contest, a literary marathon held over the Labour Day weekend during which registered contestants attempted to write a novel in three days. Pulp Press sponsored the event until 1991.

The press is located in Vancouver, BC in the city's historic Chinatown district, and employs a full-time staff of six. In 2012 it had five employees. Its main specialty is LGBT works; in 2012 it did not specialize in comics.

Arsenal Pulp Press publisher Brian Lam (co-owner of the press since 1992) has been honoured with multiple professional awards for his significant contributions to LGBTQ2s+ and BIPOC publishing in North America. In 2014 he won the Community Builder Award from the Asian Canadian Writers' Workshop. In 2018, Lam received the Ivy Award from the Toronto International Festival of Authors. In 2020, Lam was awarded the Lambda Literary Publishing Professional Award.

In the fall of 2011 Arsenal Pulp Press celebrated its 40th anniversary. The press celebrated its 50th anniversary in the fall of 2021.

In March 2021, Arsenal Pulp Press became the first Canadian small press publisher to have two books make the finale of CBC Canada Reads, Canada's national "battle of the books." The novel Jonny Appleseed by Joshua Whitehead, championed by actor Kawennáhere Devery Jacobs won the competition, beating the novel Butter Honey Pig Bread by Francesca Ekwuyasi, defended by celebrity chef Roger Mooking.

Writers
Authors who have been published by Arsenal Pulp include:

The company has also published art books by or on the work of Stan Douglas, Peter Flinsch, Attila Richard Lukacs, and Ralf König.

References

External links
 Arsenal Pulp Press

Book publishing companies of Canada
Companies based in Vancouver
Small press publishing companies
Publishing companies established in 1971
Canadian companies established in 1971
1971 establishments in British Columbia